The statue of George III, Somerset House, formally titled George III and the River Thames, is a Grade I listed outdoor bronze sculptural group depicting King George III and Neptune or Father Thames, located in the quadrangle of Somerset House, London, England. The sculptor was John Bacon, and the statue was erected between 1778 and 1789.

George III is dressed in Roman apparel, leaning on a rudder, flanked by the prow of a Roman boat and a lion. Father Thames is reclining on a lower, semi-circular plinth, one hand on an urn with a cornucopia behind him.

When Queen Charlotte first saw the statue of her husband she asked the sculptor 'Why did you make so frightful a figure?'. Bacon bowed and replied 'Art cannot always effect what is ever within the reach of Nature – the union of beauty and majesty.'

Notes

References

External links
 

1789 establishments in England
Bronze sculptures in the United Kingdom
Cultural depictions of George III
George III
Monuments and memorials in London
Outdoor sculptures in London
George III
George III